Imperial Futebol Clube, commonly known as Imperial, is a Brazilian football team from the city of Petrópolis, Rio de Janeiro state, founded on April 2, 2004. The club was formerly known as Universidade Estácio de Sá Futebol Clube and as Estácio de Sá Futebol Clube.

History
On April 2, 2004, the club was founded by Estácio de Sá University (Universidade Estácio de Sá), as Universidade Estácio de Sá Futebol Clube, but was eventually renamed to Estácio de Sá Futebol Clube. Estácio de Sá was bought by the Movimento Esportivo de Petrópolis and renamed to Imperial Futebol Clube in late 2011.

Honors
Campeonato Carioca Terceira Divisão: 2005

Stadium
Imperial Futebol Clube plays its home games at Estádio Osório Júnior, which has a maximum capacity of 5,000 people. As Estácio de Sá Futebol Clube, they played at Estádio Universidade Estácio de Sá Futebol Clube, which has a capacity of 6,000 people.

Colors
The official colors are yellow, white and black.

References

External links
Official website

Association football clubs established in 2004
Football clubs in Rio de Janeiro (state)
University and college association football clubs